Perrhybris is a Neotropical genus of butterflies in the family Pieridae.

Species
Perrhybris lorena (Hewitson, 1852)
Perrhybris lypera (Kollar, 1850)
Perrhybris pamela (Stoll, 1780)

References

Pierini
Pieridae of South America
Pieridae genera
Taxa named by Jacob Hübner